The following radio stations broadcast on FM frequency 87.9 MHz:

Argentina
 Acción in Coronel Belisle, Río Negro
 Catedral in Salta
 Ciudad in Trelew, Chubut
 Ciudad in San Miguel de Tucumán, Tucumán
 LRS886 Comunal in Sa Pereira, Santa Fe
 LRS908 in Sastre, Santa Fe
 De la Calle in Bahía Blanca, Buenos Aires
 Del Rosario in La Toma, San Luis
 Ecosur in La Cocha, Tucumán
 Estación Palpalá in Palpalá, Jujuy
 JTA in Mendoza
 Laguna in San Miguel del Monte
 LRM879 in Santa Fe
 Municipal in Villa Gesell, Buenos Aires
 Municipal in Monte Cristo, Córdoba
 Municipal in General San Martín, La Pampa
 Municipal in Florencio Varela, Buenos Aires
 Municipal in Navarro, Buenos Aires
 Municipal in Caleta Olivia, Santa Cruz
 Municipal in Villa Angela, Chaco
 Municipal in Monteros, Tucumán
 Municipal in Maciá, Entre Ríos
 Municipal in Castelli, Buenos Aires
 Municipal in Ullum, San Juan
 Nativa in Ministro Ramos Mexia, Buenos Aires
 Publica in Plottier, Neuquén
 Resistencia in Resistencia, Chaco
 UBA in Buenos Aires
 UNViMe in Villa Mercedes, San Luis
 Urbana in Lamarque, Río Negro
 Uruguay in Rosario, Santa Fe
 Via libre in María Teresa, Santa Fe

Australia
Kiss FM Australia in Melbourne, Victoria

Brazil
In Brazil, the frequency 87.9 FM is reserved for community radio stations. These stations have power limited to up to 25 watts and coverage limited to a radius of up to 1 km.

Canada
RPR in Tyendinaga Mohawk Territory, Ontario

Cayman Islands
ZFKP-FM at Georgetown

China
 CRI Hit FM in Shanghai

Finland
Yle Radio 1 in Espoo and Ylitornio
Kiss FM in Joensuu
Järviradio in Pihtipudas
Radio Kajaus in Suomossalmi

Germany
Star FM at Berlin

Italy
Radio Onda rossa at Rome

Malaysia
 Fly FM in Ipoh, Perak
 Minnal FM in Kuala Terengganu, Terengganu
 Radio Klasik in Seremban, Negeri Sembilan

Morocco
 SNRT-Agadir at Agadir

New Zealand
Various low-power stations up to 1 watt

Nigeria
 Best Afro FM, Abeokuta
 Best Afro FM, Abuja
 Best Afro FM, Lagos

Palau
T8AA-FM at Koror

Philippines
Radyo Katipunan in Quezon City
DWBC-FM in Biñan, Laguna
DXFO in Davao City

United States (Channel 200)
In 1945, the standard FM broadcasting band was assigned to channels that started at 88.1 MHz. 87.9 MHz was added in 1978, as part of a project to improve use of the non-commercial channels of 88.1 to 91.9 MHz. 87.9 MHz was designated as a potential assignment for existing 10-watt "Class D" stations which were unable increase their power to at least 100 watts, and also could not be moved to the adjoining commercial channels of 92.1 to 107.9 MHz.  Because 87.9 is also part of TV Channel 6 in the United States, its use by radio is restricted to low-power stations meeting certain strict criteria, licensed for operation on FM Channel 200. 

There are no radio stations on 87.9 MHz in the United States after the license of KSFH was deleted in December 2021, however there is one translator licensed to the frequency. The station is K200AA in Sun Valley, Nevada, a translator of CSN International. The translator was given a special grant by the FCC to move to 87.9 MHz from 88.1 MHz to protect KYSA in Sparks, Nevada, which is on 88.3 MHz.

References 

Lists of radio stations by frequency